YGEX is a Japanese record label. A subsidiary of the Avex Group, it is headquartered in Tokyo, Japan. It was founded on April 12, 2011 by Japanese record company Avex Group and South Korean entertainment company YG Entertainment, and this is the first time that Korean entertainment company has established a record label in Japan. The label's name YGEX is a portmanteau of the companies involved, YG Entertainment and AVEX, and has two meanings: "EXPERIENCE" and "EXCLUSIVE".

Overview 
The label is exclusively for singers signed to YG Entertainment. The purpose of setting up a dedicated label is to protect YG's musicality as it is. YG was more reluctant to expand into Japan than other companies in South Korea. This is because it was a burden to abandon the musical characteristics of the company and "Make it into Japanese music" when entering Japan. By setting up a dedicated label there, YG's musical commitment was protected. At the launch of the label, avex's Max Matsuura chairman stated that he would establish a "YGEX sound" that is neither K-POP nor J-POP.

Artists 
 Big Bang
 D-LITE
 G-Dragon
 SOL
 Winner
 Sechs Kies
 Treasure

Former artists 
 SE7EN
 Gummy
 2NE1
 V.I (BIGBANG) –Retired from the entertainment industry in March 2019.
 B.I (iKon)
 Blackpink –Transferred to Interscope Records / Universal Music in 2019.
 GD & TOP
 iKon

References

External links
  
 Parent Company website 

Record labels established in 2011
Japanese record labels
Record labels owned by Avex Group
YG Entertainment
2011 establishments in Japan